The Ortenau, originally called Mortenau, is a historic region in the present-day German state of Baden-Württemberg. It is located on the right bank of the river Rhine, stretching from the Upper Rhine Plain to the foothill zone of the Black Forest. In the south, it borders on the Breisgau region, covering approximately the same area as the Ortenaukreis, a present-day administrative district with its centre at Offenburg.

History
The region was first mentioned as Mordunouva  in a 763 deed. Then an early medieval county (Gau) in the German stem duchy of Swabia, it received its name from a fortification near Ortenberg at the site of later Ortenberg Castle. In 1007, King Henry II enfeoffed the Bishops of Bamberg with the Ortenau estates. However, as the bishops were not able to control their remote Swabian lands themselves, they entrusted the rule to the local noble House of Zähringen.

When the Zähringen dukes became extinct in 1218, quarrels broke out over their succession between their Baden heirs, the Bishops of Straßburg, and the Hohenstaufen emperor Frederick II. As a result, the former county disintegrated, and several smaller states formed in its place. Parts fell to the Prince-Bishopric of Strasbourg; the territories that remained in the possession of the emperor formed a Landvogtei, the Landvogtei Ortenau. Between 1803 and 1819, the Ortenau became part of the Grand Duchy of Baden.

Carolingian counties
Former states and territories of Baden-Württemberg